Diphenylmethanol is the organic compound with the formula (C6H5)2CHOH.  Also known as benzhydrol, it is a white solid and the parent member of a large class of diaryl alcohols.

Preparation
Diphenylmethanol may be prepared by a Grignard reaction between phenylmagnesium bromide and benzaldehyde.  An alternative method involves reducing benzophenone with sodium borohydride or with zinc dust or with sodium amalgam and water.

Uses and safety 
It has uses in perfume and pharmaceutical manufacture. In perfumery it is used as a fixative. In pharmaceutical manufacture it is used in the synthesis of antihistamines / antiallergenic agents and antihypertensive agents . It is used in the synthesis of Modafinil and the benzhydryl group is present in the structure of many histamine H1 antagonists like diphenylhydramine. Benzhydrol is also used in the production of agrochemicals as well as other organic compounds and as a terminating group in polymerizations.

Diphenylmethanol is an irritant to the eyes, skin and respiratory system.

References

Secondary alcohols
Benzhydryl compounds